Joanna Dong (Chinese: 董姿彦; born 15 November 1981 in Singapore) is a Singaporean singer, actress and host. Primarily a jazz vocalist, she is the first artiste signed to Singapore label, Red Roof Records.

Personal life
The only child of divorced parents, her initial forays into the world of entertainment came in the 1980s when her mother, a former Chinese teacher, started entering her into karaoke competitions, many of which she won. After attending The Raffles Girls' School and Victoria Junior College, she graduated from the National University of Singapore with honours in sociology.

Dong met her husband, theatre practitioner and educator, Zachary Ho, on the set of ‘Descendants of the Eunuch Admiral’ in 2010. They wed in 2012.

Dong is also friends with fellow Singaporean singer Olinda Cho, after they met as teammates of Team Jay Chou on the sidelines of Sing! China in 2017.

Music
She first came into the public eye when she joined the first-ever Singapore Idol competition in 2004 and reached the Top 40. Six months after exiting the talent competition, Joanna began pursuing a music career in earnest, landing her first regular singing gig in The Courtyard at Raffles Hotel. A featured performer with major local groups such as the Singapore Symphony Orchestra, JASSO and Dingyi, she is well-regarded by music industry peers. 

Dong released her EP, ‘Lullaby Nomad’, in 2008, which launched with a concert at the Esplanade Recital Studio. She also collaborated with Brazilian all-stars band, Bossa Negra, to release a single of her Mandarin translation of popular bossa nova standard ‘Summer Samba’ in 2010. She also performs with her own project bands. She has rearranged Hokkien songs in a contemporary jazz style with Peace Kopitiam Jazz Band (2012 – 2014) and reworked dirty lyrics into Christmas ditties with alternative Christmas band, Naughty “Noor” Nice (2010 – 2015). In 2015, Dong collaborated with fellow Singapore Idol, Sezairi Sezali, on the first Mandarin and Malay pop track, ‘Starlight’, for Sing, Love, a SG50 musical project by Red Roof Records.

In July 2017, Dong appeared under the spotlight again as the first of five Singapore entrants to audition for the second season of Sing! China, in which she sang a jazz arrangement of Lo Ta-yu's classic Love Song 1990, and joined Team Jay alongside fellow Singaporean, and teammate Olinda Cho. She then became the second Singaporean after Nathan Hartono to make it to the finals, after having defeated Cho the episode before that aired 29 September.

She put up a strong solo performance of Fong Fei-fei's When I Hear Applause (likewise in a jazz arrangement) and emerged second runner-up in the finals held at the Beijing National Stadium on October 8, 2017, losing out to Guo Qin of Team Na Ying and Team Liu Huan member Zhaxipingcuo of Tibet. Her third-place finish is the second best achievement in the show by Singapore thus far (behind Hartono). Nonetheless, she has expressed that she is now more confident of pursuing a singing career.

Theatre
Apart from singing, Dong, who took theatre studies at Victoria Junior College, also expressed herself on stage in various theatre productions from 1998. In 2007, she landed the principal role of Rose in If There’re Seasons..., a musical based on the music of Xinyao pioneer, Liang Wen Fook, and won Best Supporting Actress in the ST Life! Theatre Awards for her performance. She would reprise the role in 2009 and 2014 re-runs. In 2008, she played leads in Mandarin comedy, The Soldier and his Virtuous Wife and Tan Kheng Hua's raunchy directorial debut, Do Not Disturb – Late Checkout Please. In 2010, she was lead actress in the period rock musical, Liao Zhai Rocks!, inspired by colourful Qing dynasty folk stories. In 2011, Dong took on the lead of Small Papaya in Goh Boon Teck's stage production of Royston Tan's 881. She was also in the ensemble cast in Forbidden City: Portrait of an Empress (2006), Descendants of the Eunuch Admiral (2010), Impending Storm: The Silly Little Girl and the Funny Old Tree (2012), Lao Jiu: The Musical (2012) and Great World Cabaret (2015).

Discography

Extended plays

Singles

Original Soundtracks

Compilations

Collaborations

Filmography

Film
In 2011, Dong took the lead in writer/director Wee Li Lin's sophomore feature effort, Forever as a video consultant who falls for a handsome music teacher. The role earned her the Star Hunter Award at the Shanghai International Film Festival in 2011. She was also the lead actress in Thong Kay Wee's risqué short film, Hidden Folk, as a woman whose sexual affair with a 15-year-old comes back to haunt her.

Variety Shows
Dong recently expanded her repertoire to include TV hosting in Ch U's infotainment series, ‘Homeward Bound’ and ‘Life Extraordinaire’.

Awards and nominations

References

External links
Joanna's personal website

1981 births
Living people
21st-century Singaporean women singers
Singaporean people of Henghua descent
Raffles Girls' Secondary School alumni
Victoria Junior College alumni
National University of Singapore alumni
Singaporean Mandopop singers